The Georges Creek (formerly known as Georges River), a perennial stream that is part of the Macleay River catchment, is located in the Northern Tablelands and Mid North Coast regions of New South Wales, Australia.

Course and features 
The river descends  over its  course.

See also 

 Rivers of New South Wales
 List of rivers of New South Wales (A-K)
 List of rivers of Australia

References

External links 
 
 Northern Rivers Geology Blog – Macleay River

Rivers of New South Wales
New England (New South Wales)
Northern Tablelands
Mid North Coast
Armidale Regional Council